The 2019–20 Army Black Knights men's ice hockey season was the 117th season of play for the program, the 110th at the Division I level, and the 17th season in the Atlantic Hockey conference. The Black Knights represented the United States Military Academy and were coached by Brian Riley, in his 16th season.

Departures

Recruiting

Roster
As of July 1, 2019.

Standings

Schedule and Results

|-
!colspan=12 style=";" | Regular Season

|-
!colspan=12 style=";" | 

|-
!colspan=12 style=";" | 
|- align="center" bgcolor="#e0e0e0"
|colspan=12|Tournament Cancelled
|-

Scoring Statistics

Goaltending statistics

Rankings

References

Army Black Knights men's ice hockey seasons
Army Black Knights
Army Black Knights
2019 in sports in New York (state)
2020 in sports in New York (state)